Iowa Township is one of seventeen townships in Cedar County, Iowa, USA.  As of the 2000 census, its population was 460.

History
Iowa Township was organized in 1840 The first school in Iowa Township was established about 1845. (or 1841).

Geography
According to the USGS, it contains six cemeteries: Bethel, Burnett, Dunfee, Gray's Ford, North Liberty and Pee Dee.

References

External links
 US-Counties.com
 City-Data.com

Townships in Cedar County, Iowa
Townships in Iowa
1840 establishments in Iowa Territory